Johann Friedrich Flatt (20 February 1759 – 24 November 1821) was a German Protestant theologian and philosopher.

Life 
Johann Friedrich Flatt was born in Tübingen. His brother, Karl Christian Flatt (1772–1813), was also a theologian.
He studied philosophy and theology in Tübingen, afterwards continuing his education in Göttingen. In 1785 he became a professor of philosophy at the University of Tübingen, where in 1792 he was appointed an associate professor of theology. In 1798 he succeeded Gottlob Christian Storr (1746–1805) as a full professor of theology at Tübingen.

He was a disciple of Gottlob Christian Storr, and like his mentor, a representative of the so-called Ältere Tübinger Schule (conservative Tübingen school of theologians) of Biblical Supranaturalism. He is remembered as a defender of Christian moral theology, and for his critical lectures in regard to Kantian philosophy.

Along with Friedrich Gottlieb Süskind, he was an editor of the "Magazin für christliche Dogmatik und Moral" (Magazine of Christian Dogmatics and Morals).

Selected publications 
 Briefe über den moralischen Erkenntnisgrund der Religion überhaupt, und besonders in Beziehung auf die Kantische Philosophie (Tübingen 1788).
 Commentatio symbolic in qua Ecclesiae nostrae de deitate Christi sententia probatur et vindicatur, (1788).
 Observationes quaedam ad comparandam Kantianam cum disciplina christiana relevant doctrine, (1792).
 Vorlesungen über Christliche Moral ("Lectures on Christian morals"), 1823.
 Vorlesungen über die Briefe Pauli an den Timotheus und Titus ("Lectures on the letters of Saint Paul to Timothy and Titus"), 1831 (edited and published posthumously by Christian Friedrich Kling).

References 
  English translation
 Werner Raupp: Flatt, Johann Friedrich, in: The Dictionary of Eighteenth-Century German Philosophers. General Editors Heiner F. Klemme, Manfred Kuehn, Vol. 1, London/New York 2010, p. 333–334.

1759 births
1821 deaths
People from Tübingen
Academic staff of the University of Tübingen
German philosophers
18th-century German Protestant theologians
19th-century German Protestant theologians
19th-century German male writers
German male non-fiction writers
18th-century German male writers